Radio Dabanga (Arabic: راديو دبنقا) is a shortwave radio station, TV and online news magazine, that serves Sudan with daily reports on the latest political, economic and social information, including health issues and social programs such as Lost and Found. The shortwave radio has been broadcasting since 1 December 2008. Current broadcasts last for a total of one hour each day.

While Radio Dabanga only broadcast on shortwave radio for the first few years, the station now has several channels. The editors have innovated and experimented in the sphere of new media, often at the request of their listeners. These include Satellite TV, Facebook, WhatsApp, and SoundCloud. Depending on the medium, Radio Dabanga produces news in Sudanese Arabic and/or English.

Shortwave radio remains the mainstay of the radio station; one quarter of all Sudanese people are illiterate, a number that is relatively higher in Sudan’s remote areas and camps for displaced people. Many people here have no lifeline to the outside world other than telephone and radio, so it is Radio Dabanga’s mission to provide this.

Broadcasting media

Radio 

Radio broadcasting is split into the Morning News and Evening News. The morning news is broadcast from 0430 to 0500 UTC, at a frequency of 7315 and 15550 kHz and evening news is broadcast from 1530 to 1600 UTC, at a frequency of 13800 and 15550 kHz. This means that broadcasts reach Sudan between 07.30 and 08.00 in the morning and between 18:30 and 19:00 in the evening.

Besides the news bulletin, one program is broadcast every day. Editors pick which program is most suitable depending on the news of the day.

Other programs include Lost and Found, Hababkum Darfur ("We Greet Darfur"), Melodies from Darfur, Sudan Files, and Press Review. Lost and Found is a program which aims to reunite loved ones who have lost contact with each other when fleeing conflict, while Hababkum Darfur allows callers to send greetings across the airwaves to listeners in other places. Occasionally, drama programs are also broadcast over Radio Dabanga.

Fi Al Mizan ("On the Scale") was a justice program co-produced by Radio Dabanga and the Institute for War and Peace Reporting. It focused on local and international justice issues.

Initially, in 2008 Radio Dabanga was broadcast for one hour per day. This increased to three hours per day, but because of the high cost of shortwave, Dabanga went back to the original one hour per day; half an hour in the morning and half an hour in the afternoon.

Broadcasts are made in Sudanese Arabic. In the past, broadcasts also featured news in Darfuri Arabic, Fur, Masalit and Zaghawa.

Television 

Radio Dabanga has been broadcasting its TV satellite channel on Eutelsat since 18 February 2018 on frequency 11354 GHz. The TV Satellite broadcasts the latest radio programs 24 hours per day, showing the latest headlines of Radio Dabanga in text on-screen.

Online 

Radio programs, which are broadcast via shortwave radio and satellite TV, are also Facebook page. On 21 August 2018, Radio Dabanga had uploaded a total of 1,848 broadcasts to its SoundCloud channel.

Radio Dabanga produces news articles in Arabic, which are published on the Arabic website, social media and WhatsApp groups. Arabic news is often translated and reworked to suit an international audience on the English language part of the website and social media platforms.

Reporting
Radio Dabanga reports in exile from Amsterdam. Until 2012 the editorial team operated out of facilities at Radio Netherlands Worldwide, a public radio and television network based in the city of Hilversum. Since then the radio station has operated from the offices of Free Press Unlimited in Amsterdam.

Before 2013, Radio Dabanga's main focus was conflict areas such as Darfur and the Blue Nile, producing independent news and relevant information for people of Darfur, including internally displaced persons and refugees. Since then the station increasingly shifted to being a reliable source of information for people in all parts of Sudan, covering a wide range of events and issues.

The editor-in-chief is Kamal Elsadig, overseeing a small group of reporters who work at the central desk in Amsterdam. The radio station receives news from people in the field. These stringers get in contact with the team with information about specific events, which the team then uses to verify and compile as news.

Audience participation is a significant source of information, as listeners call the radio studios with their own stories and tips. Increasingly, the editors use WhatsApp as a tool to receive, verify and publish news from interested individuals and specialist groups such as medics and civil servants in Sudan.

Audience 
Radio Dabanga radio broadcasts reach 2.3 million individual listeners per day (the population of Sudan is around 40 million) according to a listener survey conducted in 2009. The survey was held among 1,582 respondents over the age of 18 in cities, towns, and Darfur’s refugee camps. The satellite TV channel is watched by an average of 1 million people per day in Greater Khartoum. Overall, the 2009 survey and spot checks in Khartoum revealed that Radio Dabanga reaches 6.5 million people per week via shortwave radio and satellite TV. More information about the online audience of Radio Dabanga is presented in an infographic on their website.

Supporters
Radio Dabanga is conceived, operated and facilitated by the Dutch NGO Free Press Unlimited in the Netherlands. It was founded in 2008 by a coalition of Sudanese journalists, a number of international NGOs and the movers behind the Dutch campaign ‘Tot Zover Darfur’, including Stichting Vluchteling, Pax for Peace and Stichting Doen.

Controversies and state censorship 
While Radio Dabanga has a large audience in Sudan, the organization has been criticized by the Sudanese government in the past. The station has survived a number of government efforts to take TV Satellite and shortwave radio broadcasts off-air, including attempts at jamming and prosecution of reporters.

Television blocking 

Radio Dabanga's TV satellite channel was first set up in 2013 with Arabsat. After being taken down by the company in 2015 due to requests by the Sudanese government, Radio Dabanga began broadcasting with Nilesat instead. At the time, Arabsat stated that "Radio Dabanga is considered an enemy of the Sudanese government, it's not about a few controversial news items but about the whole station."

Radio Dabanga's channel was taken down from Nilesat in February 2018 due to a new request from the Sudanese government. Faisal El Bagir of the network of Journalists for Human Rights stated at the time: "This measure illustrates that the regime does not tolerate independent opinions and voices, especially when it comes to the voices of those who would otherwise never be heard." After that, Radio Dabanga has been broadcasting via Eutelsat, a Paris-based broadcasting company.

Since the Sudanese revolution, Radio Dabanga has increased its coverage by expanding the number of reporters and stringers based in the country.

References

External links
 

Radio stations in Sudan
Shortwave radio stations
Exile organizations
News media in Sudan